A solutional cave, solution cave, or karst cave is a cave usually formed in the soluble rock limestone. It is the most frequently occurring type of cave. It can also form in other rocks, including chalk, dolomite, marble, salt beds, and gypsum.

Process 
Bedrock is dissolved by natural acid in groundwater that seeps through bedding-planes, faults, joints and so on. Over geological epochs these openings expand as the walls are dissolved to become caves or cave systems.

The portions of a solutional cave that are below the water table or the local level of the groundwater will be flooded.

Limestone caves 

The largest and most abundant solutional caves are located in limestone.  Limestone caves are often adorned with calcium carbonate formations produced through slow precipitation. These include flowstones, stalactites, stalagmites, helictites, soda straws, calcite rafts and columns. These secondary mineral deposits in caves are called speleothems.

Carbonic acid dissolution 
Limestone dissolves under the action of rainwater and groundwater charged with H2CO3 (carbonic acid) and naturally occurring organic acids. The dissolution process produces a distinctive landform known as karst, characterized by sinkholes and underground drainage. Solutional caves in this landform—topography are often called karst caves.

Sulfuric acid dissolution 
Lechuguilla Cave in New Mexico and nearby Carlsbad Cavern are now believed to be examples of another type of solutional cave. They were formed by H2S (hydrogen sulfide) gas rising from below, where reservoirs of petroleum give off sulfurous fumes. This gas mixes with ground water and forms H2SO4 (sulfuric acid). The acid then dissolves the limestone from below, rather than from above, by acidic water percolating from the surface.

Examples

Australia 
 Jenolan Caves, New South Wales

Taiwan 
 Black Dwarf Cave, Pingtung County

United States 
 Jewel Cave National Monument, South Dakota
 Mammoth Cave National Park, Kentucky
 Russell Cave National Monument, Alabama
 Wind Cave National Park, South Dakota
 Oregon Caves National Monument and Preserve, Oregon

Vietnam 
 Hang Sơn Đoòng, Quảng Bình Province

References

Sources

External links 
 

Karst caves